William Jocelyn Smyly (22 July 192216 May 2018) was a soldier, journalist and educator.  He was one of the last veterans of the two Chindit expeditions in the Burma campaign.

Early life
Bill Smyly was born in Peking and was educated at Wrekin College and joined the Army straight from school.

Soldier
Bill Smyly took part in two of the Chindits operations behind enemy lines in Burma. On the first one he made a hard-won escape after being separated from his unit.

After the war
After the war he went up to Clare College, Cambridge reading History and English.  He then became a journalist.  After a stint in the UK he moved to Hong Kong working at the South China Morning Post.  Then he took up Education, working at the Diocesan Boys' School, and eventually at the Chinese university in Hong Kong. After taking a post graduate degree at Leeds University he joined the British Council

References

1922 births
2018 deaths
People from Beijing
Alumni of Clare College, Cambridge
People educated at Wrekin College
Alumni of the University of Leeds
British Indian Army officers
Indian Army personnel of World War II
Gurkhas
British expatriates in China